The 1988 Spanish Open was a women's tennis tournament played on outdoor clay courts at the Real Club de Tenis Barcelona in Barcelona, Catalonia in Spain and was part of the Category 1 tier of the 1988 WTA Tour. It was the seventh edition of the tournament and was held from 25 April to 1 May 1988. Fifth-seeded Neige Dias won the singles title.

Finals

Singles

 Neige Dias defeated  Bettina Fulco 6–3, 6–3
 It was Dias' only singles title of the year and the 2nd and last of her career.

Doubles

 Iva Budařová /  Sandra Wasserman defeated  Anna-Karin Olsson /  María José Llorca 1–6, 6–3, 6–2
 It was Budařová's only title of the year and the 3rd of her career. It was Wasserman's only title of the year and the 1st of her career.

References

External links
 ITF tournament edition details

 
Spanish Open
Spanish Open (tennis)
Open